Hiroko Hara (born 10 February 1972), now Hiroko Friend-Lomans, is a Japanese former professional tennis player.

A highly ranked junior player, Hara was a national team representative at the World Youth Cup.

While competing on the professional tour she reached a best singles ranking of 319 and qualified for the 1994 Nokia Open in Beijing, where she lost her first round match to Park Sung-hee in three sets.

Hara, who now lives in the Netherlands, is the mother of tennis player Jay Dylan Hara Friend.

ITF finals

Singles: 2 (1–1)

Doubles: 1 (0–1)

References

External links
 
 

1972 births
Living people
Japanese female tennis players
20th-century Japanese women
21st-century Japanese women